Ekendra Singh (born 16 June 1957) is a football manager who most recently managed Kenkre FC in the I-League 2nd Division.

Coaching career

Sporting Clube de Goa
In the summer of 2010 Singh signed with then I-League 2nd Division club Sporting Clube de Goa who were just relegated from the I-League after the 2009–10 season. After his first season in charge he led Sporting Goa to second place in the 2011 I-League 2nd Division Final Round and promotion back to the I-League.

Kenkre
On 1 January 2015, Singh was appointed as head coach of I-League 2nd Division side Kenkre, and managed the team until 31 May 2021.

References

1957 births
Living people
I-League managers
Indian football managers
Sporting Clube de Goa managers